Haverfordwest power station supplied electricity to the town of Haverfordwest, Wales and the surrounding area from 1931 to the late 1960s. It was initially owned and operated by the West Cambrian Power Company Limited, then by the British Electricity Authority following nationalisation in 1948. It comprised diesel engines driving electricity alternators.

History
Haverfordwest power station was commissioned in 1931 and further generating plant was added up to 1954. The power station was owned and operated by the West Cambrian Power Company Limited which also owned the power stations at Lampeter, Llandysul and St. Clears. The British electricity supply industry was nationalised in 1948, and the power company was abolished and ownership of Haverfordwest power station was vested in the British Electricity Authority. The power station was decommissioned in the late 1960s.

Plant
The station finally comprised eight diesel engines driving alternators. The engines were by the following manufacturers:

 3 × Fraser & Chalmers
 2 × Atlas
 1 × BPE
 2 × Crosley

Six of the alternators were by GEC and two were Brush, the range of generating capacities were:

 2 × 1.2 MW
 2 × 1 MW
 1 × 1.05 MW
 1 × 0.575 MW
 2 × 1.2 MW

All the alternators generated current at 11 kV.

Operations
Operating data for the period 1946–67 was:

See also
 Timeline of the UK electricity supply industry
 List of power stations in Wales

References

Demolished power stations in the United Kingdom
Haverfordwest